The 52nd Grey Cup was hosted at CNE Stadium in Toronto, Ontario on November 28, 1964. The BC Lions defeated the Hamilton Tiger-Cats 34–24, the first Grey Cup victory for BC.

Bill Munsey on offence and defence
BC player Bill Munsey scored two touchdowns in the third quarter, one on offence and another on defence. Having replaced injured running back Bob Swift, he took a handoff from quarterback Joe Kapp, and broke over right guard for an 18-yard touchdown. Later in the quarter, at the BC 35-yard line, Hamilton quarterback Bernie Faloney lateraled to halfback Johnny Counts, who dropped the ball. In the ensuing scramble for the fumbled ball, Munsey picked it up and ran 71 yards for another touchdown. Bob Swift, Willie Fleming and Jim Carphin also scored TDs for the Lions, the latter on a pass from Pete Ohler on a botched field goal attempt.

Video

External links
 

Grey Cup
Grey Cup
Grey Cups hosted in Toronto
Hamilton Tiger-Cats
BC Lions
1964 in Toronto
1964 in Canadian television
November 1964 sports events in Canada